The Kabardino-Balkarian Autonomous Oblast was an autonomous oblast within the Kabardino-Balkaria region of the Soviet Union.  The Oblast was formed in 1921 as the Kabardin Autonomous Oblast before becoming the Kabardino-Balkarian Autonomous Oblast on 16 January 1922. On 16 October 1924 it became part of the North Caucasus Krai, but was separated from it on 5 December 1936, elevated in status and renamed the Kabardino-Balkarian Autonomous Soviet Socialist Republic.

See also 
History of Kabardino-Balkaria
First Secretary of the Kabardino–Balkarian Communist Party

References 

Autonomous oblasts of the Soviet Union
States and territories established in 1921
1922 establishments in Russia
1936 disestablishments in the Soviet Union
History of Kabardino-Balkaria